Prostenomphalia is a monotypic genus of gastropods belonging to the family Hygromiidae. The only species is Prostenomphalia carpathica.

The species is inhabits terrestrial environments.

References

Hygromiidae